William A. Switzer Provincial Park is a provincial park in Alberta, Canada.

It is located on both sides of the Bighorn Highway, between Grande Cache and Hinton. Various campgrounds are maintained on the shores of Gregg Lake, Cache Lake, Blue Lake and Jarvis Lake.

It was established on December 22, 1958 and is maintained by Alberta Tourism, Parks and Recreation. The park is named after former provincial Member of the Legislative Assembly William Switzer.

Activities

The following activities are available in the park:
Beach activities, swimming
Birdwatching (loons, grebes, ospreys, bald eagles, great grey owls, snipes and northern saw-whet owls)
Camping
Canoeing and kayaking (including an interpretative canoe route)
Fishing and ice fishing (brown trout and rainbow trout)
Front country hiking (at Athabasca Lookout and Beaver Ranch, around Blue Lake, Gregg Lake, Jarvis Lake, Kelley's Bathtub, Kettle and Winter Creek)
Mountain biking (Gregg Lake trail, Jarvis Lake trail)
Power boating, sailing, water-skiing, windsurfing
Snowmobiling (on lakes only)
Tobogganing (at Athabasca Lookout Nordic Centre)
Wildlife viewing (white-tailed deer, mule deer, elk, moose, bear, coyote,  wood frog, timber wolf, beaver, mink, muskrat and woodland caribou)

See also
List of Alberta provincial parks
List of National Parks of Canada

References

External links

Provincial parks of Alberta
Yellowhead County